The Law and Mr Lee is a 2003 American TV film.

Plot
An ex-con becomes a private detective.

Cast
Danny Glover

References

External links
 

2003 television films
2003 films
Films produced by Aaron Spelling
American television films
Films directed by Kevin Rodney Sullivan